Lorane is an unincorporated community in Lane County, Oregon, United States. The community is near the headwaters of the North Fork Siuslaw River in a valley in the foothills of the Central Oregon Coast Range. Local businesses include several wineries, including the King Estate Winery, Chateau Lorane Winery and Iris Hill Winery, and two general stores.

Lorane is also home to several notable late-19th-century/early-20th-century buildings, including the Lorane Christian Church, built in 1889, the Lorane Rebekah Lodge, built in 1898, and the Lorane Grange hall, built in 1909.

Although Lorane is unincorporated, it has a post office; Lorane's ZIP code is 97451.

Lorane is served by the Crow-Applegate-Lorane School District, including Lorane Elementary School, which was established in 1892 but closed in 2011.

History

Lorane was settled by white settlers who participated in the US expansion Westward to Oregon, encouraged by the Donation Land Claim Act of 1850, which gave 320 acres of free land to any unmarried white male citizen, or 640 acres to every married couple, who moved to the Oregon Territory before December 1, 1850.  First settler contact in Lorane is thought to have occurred in the early 1850s, with significant colonial landmarks being the Applegate Trail, a stagecoach route, the Cartwright House (Mountain House Hotel), and the original landscape intended for the Southern Pacific Railroad.  The Railroad was built in Cottage Grove, 12 miles east of Lorane.

The indigenous keepers of the land that Lorane occupies are the Siuslaw people, who are believed to have arrived to the Oregon coast over 9,000 years ago.  They spoke the Siuslaw language, but the last documented speakers of Siuslawan were the Barrett family and Billy Dick of Florence, who were interviewed in the 1950s. However, there are ongoing language revitalization efforts, knowledge of which is exclusive to tribal members.

The white settler-colonizers of Lorane arrived after the Siuslaw people had been devastated by smallpox and ague fever (now believed to be akin to malaria) that arrived to the Oregon coast due to Spanish sailors in the 1770s, which was followed by further outbreaks in the 1830s.  Researchers believe that the Siuslaw population was reduced to a few hundred from 3,000 in 30–40 years.  The devastation introduced by settler-colonizers in the form of disease was coupled with massive wildfires and cultural genocide on the part of white settlers.  On August 13, 1954, Dwight D. Eisenhower signed Public Law 588, which "terminated" the Siuslaw people, refusing them recognition and ending trust protection and services from the Bureau of Indian Affairs. In 1960, Siuslaw people were forcibly relocated to Yachats, at the Alsea subagency on the Yachats River. They were imprisoned here for 17 years and forced to farm the land. 50% of tribal members, which included the Siuslaw, Hanis Coos, Miluk Coos, and the Kiutsch, or Lower Umpqua, died from starvation, mistreatment, exhaustion, and disease.

Not until October 17, 1984, when Ronald Reagan signed Public Law 98-481, was Tribal Sovereignty recognized, after a grueling battle on the part of the indigenous people.  In 1987, what became the Confederated Tribes of Coos, Lower Umpqua and Siuslaw Indians ratified a constitution and began to work rigorously on developing their community and political agency.  Today, the Confederated Tribes run the Three Rivers Casino and Resort, and Blue Earth Services and Technology and provide services to five counties: Coos, Curry, Lincoln, Douglas, and Lane.

Today, knowledge of the indigenous inhabitants of Lorane has all but disappeared in the community of Lorane. Documented interaction with the first settler-colonizers of Lorane and the Siuslaw people is exceptionally rare, summed up by the statement "there is a tradition of a Siuslaw village in the Lorane Valley, southwest of Eugene."  The land that Lorane rests on possesses a history that has been confined to the past due to the lack of Siuslaw people in the area of Lorane and the ease in which white settlers claim land as their own.

References

External links
Images of the historic 1855 Cartwright House near Lorane, which was razed in 1973 (from Salem Public Library)
Cartwright House (Mountain House) from the Oregon Historical Society
Darius B. Cartwright House from the Historic American Buildings Survey
Images of Cartwright House from the University of Oregon archives

Unincorporated communities in Lane County, Oregon
Unincorporated communities in Oregon